BGU may refer to:
 Bakke Graduate University, a United States accredited graduate school of Dallas, TX
 Bangassou Airport, a public use airport located near Bangassou, Mbomou, the Central African Republic
 Bau Geo Umwelt, a department of the Technical University of Munich
 Ben-Gurion University of the Negev in Beersheba, Israel
 Birla Global University in Bhubaneswar, India
 Bishop Grosseteste University, a public university in the city of Lincoln, England
 Border Guard Unit of the Ghana Armed Forces
 Berliner griechische Urkunden, a collection of papyrus documents